Greek Street (US title Latin Love) is a 1930 British musical film directed by Sinclair Hill and starring Sari Maritza, William Freshman and Martin Lewis. It was made by Gaumont British at their Lime Grove Studios in Shepherd's Bush. The film's sets were designed by Andrew Mazzei. The film takes its title from Greek Street in Central London.

Cast
 Sari Maritza as Anna  
 William Freshman as Rikki  
 Martin Lewis as Mansfield Yates  
 Bert Coote as Sir George Ascot  
 Renee Clama as Lucia 
 Bruce Winston as Max  
 Peter Haddon as Businessman  
 Rex Maurice as Businessman  
 Stanelli as Business Man  
 Fanny Wright as Wife 
 Arthur Hambling as Alfie  
 Andreas Malandrinos as Carlo  
 Eric Pavitt as Boy

References

Bibliography
 Low, Rachael. Filmmaking in 1930s Britain. George Allen & Unwin, 1985.
 Wood, Linda. British Films, 1927-1939. British Film Institute, 1986.

External links

1930 films
British musical films
British black-and-white films
1930 musical films
Films directed by Sinclair Hill
Films shot at Lime Grove Studios
Films set in London
Gainsborough Pictures films
1930s English-language films
1930s British films